Boboli may refer to:
Boboli Gardens, a park in Florence
Boboli (pizza), a brand of ready-made pizza crusts owned by Grupo Bimbo
Boboli (clothing), a line of children's clothing